Brent London Borough Council in London, England is elected every four years. Since the last boundary changes in 2002, 63 councillors have been elected from 21 wards.

Political control
The first election to the council was held in 1964, initially operating as a shadow authority before the new system came into full effect in 1965. Political control of the council since 1964 has been held by the following parties:

Leadership
The leaders of the council since 1965 have been:

Council elections
Summary of the council composition after each council election, click on the year for full details of each election.

Borough result maps

Summary of results
Summary of recent by-elections;

Detailed results

1968–1971

Chamberlayne

Kenton

Wembley Park

Tokyngton

1971–1974

Carlton

St Raphael's

Stonebridge

Brentwater

1974–1978

Carlton

Sudbury

Wembley Park

Manor

Fryent

1978–1982

1982–1986

1986–1990

1990–1994

The by-election was called following the resignation of Cllr. Richard E. Hume.

The by-election was called following the resignation of Cllr. Hazel A. D. Baird.

The by-election was called following the resignation of Cllr. Jean M. Spray.

The by-election was called following the death of Cllr. Mike Harskin.

The by-election was called following the resignation of Cllr. Harriet J. Harper.

1998–2002

Kilburn
A by-election was held in Kilburn on 11 March 1999 after the death of Labour councillor Peter Pendsay. The seat was held for Labour by Noel Thompson with a majority of 486 votes over Conservative Shaun Port.

Roe Green
A by-election took place in Roe Green on 27 July 2000 after the resignation of Labour councillor John Duffy. The seat was held for Labour by Maureen Queally with a majority of 92 votes over Conservative Joel Games.

Fryent
A by-election took place in Fryent on 1 March 2001 after the death of Labour councillor Lawrence Pardoe. The seat was held for Labour by George Crane with a majority of 163 votes over Conservative Alan Wall.

2002–2006

Fryent
A by-election was held in Fryent on 16 June 2005 after the death of Labour councillor Asish Sengupta. The seat was held for Labour by Ruth Moher with a majority of 36 votes over Conservative Sue-Ellen Fernandes.

Preston
A by-election was held in Preston ward on 16 June 2005 after the death of Conservative councillor Tom Taylor. The seat was held for the Conservatives by Alan Mondoza with a majority of 402 votes over Labour's Wilhelmina Mitchell Murray.

2006–2010

Dudden Hill
A by-election was held in Dudden Hill on 24 May 2007 after a seat was declared vacant, as Liberal Democrat Pawan Gupta was found to have been disqualified from standing at the 2006 election as he was employed by the council at the time. Pawan Gupta held the seat at the by-election with a majority of 85 votes over Labour's Aslam Choudry.

Stonebridge
A by-election was held in Stonebridge on 13 September 2007 after the death of Labour councillor Dorman Long. The seat was held for Labour by Zaffar Van Kalwala with a majority of 568 votes over Liberal Democrat Sandra Wiltshire.

Queens Park

Wembley Central
A by-election was held in Wembley Central on 23 July 2009 after councillor Vijah Shah was sentenced to a year in prison. Shah had been elected as a Liberal Democrat but expelled from the party in 2008 after he was arrested. The seat was held for the Liberal Democrats by Afifa Pervez with a majority of 261 votes over Labour's Jayesh Mistry.

2010–2014

Kenton
A by-election was held in Kenton on 17 February 2011 after the death of Conservative councillor Arthur Steel. The seat was held for the Conservatives by Suresh Kansagra, who had previously been a councillor for Barnhill until his defeat at the 2010 election, with a majority of 156 votes over Labour's Ellie Southward.

Wembley Central
A by-election was held in Wembley Central on 22 December 2011 after the resignation of Labour councillor Jayesh Mistry. The seat was held for Labour by Krupa Sheth with a majority of 380 votes over Liberal Democrat Afifa Pervez.

Dollis Hill
A by-election was held in Dollis Hill on 22 March 2012 after the death of Liberal Democrat councillor Alec Castle. The seat was held for the Liberal Democrats by Alison Hopkins with a majority of 37 votes over Labour's Parvez Ahmed.

Barnhill
A by-election was held in Barnhill on 3 May 2012 after the resignation of Labour councillor Judith Beckman. The seat was held for Labour by Michael Pavey with a majority of 1,146 votes over Conservative Kanta Pindoria.

2014–2018

Kenton
A by-election took place in Kenton on 5 March 2015 after the death of Conservative councillor Bhiku Patel. The seat was held for the Conservatives by Michael Maurice with a majority of 258 votes over Labour's Vincent Lo.

Kensal Green
A by-election took place in Kensal Green on 17 December 2015 after the death of Councillor Dan Filson, a member of the Labour Party. Jumbo Chan held the seat for Labour.

Kilburn
A by-election took place in Kilburn on 5 May 2016 after the death of Councillor Tayo Oladapo, a member of the Labour Party. Barbara Pitruzzella, also of the Labour Party, won the election.

2018–2022

Alperton
A by-election took place in Alperton on 23 January 2020 after the resignation of Labour councillor James Allie. Harpale was suspended from the Labour Party during the campaign.

Barnhill
A by-election took place in Barnhill on 23 January 2020 after the resignations of 2 Labour councillors: Michael Pavey on 26 November 2019. and Sarah Marquis on 29 November 2019. The result was challenged by an election petition from the Conservative candidates alleging irregularities during the count, however the result was upheld.

Wembley Central
A by-election took place in Wembley Central on 23 January 2020 after the resignation of Labour councillor Luke Patterson.

Brondesbury Park
A by-election took place in Brondesbury Park on 6 May 2021 after the resignation of Labour councillor Kieron Gill.

References

23 January 2020 by-election

External links
Brent Council